Frozen is a 1997 Chinese film directed by Wang Xiaoshuai. The film was originally shot in 1994, but was banned by Chinese authorities and had to be smuggled out of the country. Moreover, Wang was operating under a blacklisting from the Chinese Film Bureau that was imposed after his previous film, The Days, was screened internationally without government approval. As such, Wang was forced to use the pseudonym "Wu Ming" (literally "Anonymous") while making this film.

The film, supposedly based on a true story, follows a young performance artist, Qi Lei, who attempts to create a masterpiece centred on the theme of death. After two "acts" where he simulates death, he decides that his final act will be a true suicide through hypothermia.

Frozen was originally titled The Great Game. This was meant to reflect the attitude of both the film and the artist portrayed within it to treat death and suicide as a game or a manipulation.

Canadian scholar Erik Bordeleau has interpreted Frozen as an allegory of the aftermath of the 1989 Tiananmen Square protests in China. Qi Lei’s “experience of a radical loss of social subjectivity, staged in performative terms, powerfully echoes also that of the Tiananmen survivors, those whose lives did not come to an end, as did the world to which they belonged.”

Casting 
Like Wang's first film, The Days, Frozen was cast primarily with friends of Wang Xiaoshuai. Unlike in his earlier film, the two leads of Frozen were professional actors who would become major figures in the sixth generation movement. Actor Jia Hongsheng was selected to play Qi Lei, a performance artist who decides to make his own death his final work. Jia would go on to star in other sixth generation films, notably with director Lou Ye in Weekend Lover (1994) and Suzhou River (2000). 
Wang selected Jia in part because he was unconventional looking and in Wang's words, Jia "does not look like an actor." But because Jia was Wang's friend, he did not demand payment, thus allowing the film to operate on a smaller budget.

The other lead, Shao Yun, Qi Lei's girlfriend, was played by actress Ma Xiaoqing. Her casting was done in part to create parity with Jia. Wang wanted both leads to be professional actors.

Production 
The film proved to be a difficult shoot, much like its predecessor. However, the problems that plagued Frozen were far different from the obstacles of The Days. By far the greatest issue during filming was the content of the film. Several key scenes required actor Jia Hongsheng to recreate performance art, such as soap-eating, and in the film's ultimate scene, self-freezing. Both scenes were difficult to capture although the scene which demanded that Jia lay in ice for several minutes was the most dangerous. Indeed, Wang had to have Jia sent to the hospital immediately after shooting to check for permanent damage.

DVD release 
Frozen was released on DVD by Fox Lorber on February 22, 2000 in the United States. The Fox Lorber edition was basic, but included English subtitles and some extra features, including production notes and cast and crew filmographies.

Awards and nominations
Frozen was nominated at the International Film Festival Rotterdam for the Tiger Award, and won the FIPRESCI Award for Special Mention.

Notes

External links 
 
 
 Frozen at the Chinese Movie Database
 Frozen from US Distributor, International Film Circuit, Inc.

1997 drama films
1997 films
Chinese drama films
Films directed by Wang Xiaoshuai
Films set in Beijing
1990s Mandarin-language films